This comparison of disc authoring software compares different optical disc authoring software.

Application

General information
Basic general information about the application.

Operating system support 
The list is not exhaustive, but rather reflects the most common operating systems.

Optical media support 

Which single-sided optical media types the application supports. The list is not exhaustive, but rather reflects the most common types in use (i.e. not the now defunct HD DVD-R & UDO)

Filesystem support 

Which filesystems the application supports.

Disk image format support 
Information which Disk image formats an application supports.

Standards support 
Support for Rainbow book standards:
 Red book: CD-DA
 Yellow book: CD-ROM
 Orange book: CD-R and CD-RW
 White book: VCD and SVCD
 Blue book: E-CD
 Beige book: PCD
 Green book: CD-i discs
 Purple book: DDCD
 Scarlet book: SACD

User interface 

Information which User interfaces an application supports.

See also 

Optical disc authoring software
List of optical disc authoring software
Comparison of disc image software

Notes 

 
Disc authoring